Cora setosa is a species of basidiolichen in the family Hygrophoraceae. It is only known to occur at the type locality, where it grows as an epiphyte on branches in partially shaded spots. The specific epithet refers to the setose (i.e. bristly) lateral lobe margins. Similar species include Cora cyphellifera, C. aspera, and C. gyrolophia.

References

setosa
Lichen species
Lichens described in 2014
Lichens of Colombia
Basidiolichens
Taxa named by Robert Lücking